Thomas Danielsson (born 4 December 1964) is a Swedish former racing driver.

Japanese Formula 3000 Championship results 
(key) (Races in bold indicate pole position) (Races in italics indicate fastest lap)

References

1964 births
Living people
Swedish racing drivers
FIA European Formula 3 Championship drivers
International Formula 3000 drivers
Japanese Formula 3000 Championship drivers
24 Hours of Le Mans drivers
World Sportscar Championship drivers

Karting World Championship drivers